Jayciana, is the annual cultural festival of the Sri Jayachamarajendra College of Engineering, Mysuru usually held during April – May.

The 2016 edition of Jayciana will see the maiden performance of West Indian cricketer Dwayne John Bravo, singer Benny Dayal, tabla band Beat Gurus and artiste V. Brodha. Jayciana 2014 had maiden performance of  Romanian dance pop act Akcent, Sandalwood actor Vijay Raghavendra as part of the jury of a dance competition, music by Shankar Mahadevan and his troupe, showcase of their ethnic collection and judging a fashion contest by Prasad Bidapa. Sandalwood theater actor Dhananjay, then a student days at SJCE participated in dramatics, and folk dance events. Sandalwood actor, filmmaker and a television presenter Ramesh Arvind had participated and won prizes as an engineering student in Jayciana.

History and Growth 

Jayciana was started back in 1977, completing 30 years of hosting in 2006 by the students union.

Jayciana 2006 was inaugurated by Rangayana theatre Director Chidambar Rao Jambe and Fusion music performance was given by the troupe, Swarathma and 'Swaranjana', a rock band. In 2007 Dirt track was held for both four-wheelers and two-wheelers. The four-wheeler race categorized as time-speed and distance covering nearly 100 km of route length touching the Outer Ring Road of Mysuru, Bogadi, Jayapura, H.D. Kote Road, KRS Road and back,. 2007 Jayciana also had performance from Sandalwood actor Prem

In 2009, marathon was held for awareness among the people which was won by sriharsha (mysore university), rutvik (mysore university), Sevant kumar (sjce) on road safety. Jayciana 2010 saw presence of Indian film actor and a former model Diganth, Parsi model and actress from Mumbai Jennifer Kotwal and Late Kannada film director Sandeep S Gowda. On 25 April 2010 Parikrama performed in Jayciana. The marathon of 2010 was for awareness on Save the tigers. Jayciana 2011 saw presence of Sandalwood actor Vijaya Raghavendra and other cast members of Kannada movie Sri Vinayaka Geleyara Balaga. It also included performance by singer-songwriter Raghu Dixit. 2011 marathon was for awareness on corruption.

Jayciana 2012 included 'Ride for Safety', a Harley-Davidson rally by Bangalore Pandhi's that included Sportster, Fatboy, Iron 833 and Street Bob and expo was organised on 21 April 2012. Limca Record holder Amar Sen displayed his sand art skills. The marathon called as 'Green Run' was organised for awareness on importance of a clean and green environment. 'Jaycycle', a cycle marathon was organised for awareness on conserving the earth and fossil fuels, protecting the environment and reducing greenhouse gas emissions, as well as the necessity for staying healthy and fit with regular exercise and to urge more people to take to cycling. People For Animals (PFA), an animal welfare oriented NGO located at Bogadi, Mysuru was involved in awareness on protecting animals against cruelty and work to bring about a change in attitudes, laws and lifestyles towards improving conditions for animals.

In Jayciana 2013 specially abled Aalok Jain showcased his talent. The 2014 edition of Jayciana also saw performance by Abhinava Dance Company of Nirupama-Rajendra and presence of Sriimurali who is also known by names 'Murali' or 'Srimurali', an Indian actor who works predominantly in Kannada cinema and Ragini Dvivedi, an Indian film actor and model who appears in South Indian cinema, but primarily in Kannada cinema were Chief Guest. Cycle marathon, was organised to spread awareness on voting in view of the then upcoming 2014 Lok Sabha elections and also educate people on protecting the environment, which was flagged off by Kannada film director Suni.
 The marathon under the theme of ‘Vote and save democracy’ served for awareness on democracy and voting.

Jayciana 2015 saw performances by singer Jonita Gandhi, EDM by SUNBURN and flute player Praveen Godkhindi. In Jayciana 2016, Cyclothon plans to spread awareness on 'One nation. One beautiful city. Let's keep it clean'

Jayciana 2017 saw performances by Vijay Prakash, Shefali Alvares and Edward Maya; and a guest appearance by Darshan Thoogudeepa.

In Jayciana 2018 performance is expected by Vasishta Simha, Prakriti Kakar, Lost Stories team and Chetas.

Events
Generally, organised events are:
 Sports – Chess, Kabaddi, cyclothon, marathon, basketball, badminton, table tennis, volleyball, cricket, football, throwball, arm wrestling, tug of war, frisbee, handball, car and bike expo and rally respectively
 Pet show
 Cultural and Art – dramatics, and folk dance, ethnic day, flash mob, rock show, singing, Miss Jayciana, fashion show, skit, photo marathon, mad advertisements, charades, pictionary, debate, extempore, film music, folk songs, group songs, an array of dances and orchestra
 Informals – Quizzes, paintball, treasure hunt
 Digital Arts – Computer Gaming, short movie, band wars

Artists and Celebrities
Previously actors like Upendra have made their presence felt at Jayciana.

Media, Associates, Partners and Publicity
Jayciana has received coverage in print, digital as well as online media like Deccan Herald, The New Indian Express, The Times of India, The Hindu, Star of Mysore(Mysore, India) and News 1 ಕನ್ನಡ ( News 1 Kannada ).

Associates, Partners and Publicity

Few of the sponsors were Friendly Motors, Mysuru, Sandesh The Prince, Samast International, Pathak Developers Pvt. Ltd, ನಂದಿನಿ, ಕೆ ಎಂ ಎಫ್ ( Nandini K M F ), Merako Media Pvt. Ltd, Mysore Socials, Loyal World, Windflower Spa, Sobha Limited, Cafe Cornucopia, Chirag ads, Bailley, Radisson Blu Plaza Hotel, News 1 ಕನ್ನಡ ( News 1 Kannada ), DRC Cinemas and MasthMysore.

References

External links
 Jayciana 2016 – Official website
 Jayciana 2016, Sri Jayachamarajendra College of Engineering – Facebook Page
 Jayciana 2016 – Instagram
 Jayciana 2015, Sri Jayachamarajendra College of Engineering – Facebook Page
 Jayciana 2014, Sri Jayachamarajendra College of Engineering – Facebook Page
 Jayciana 2013, Sri Jayachamarajendra College of Engineering – Facebook Page
 PFA People For Animals Mysore
 People For Animals, Mysore – Facebook Page

Culfests
Recurring events established in 1980
Cultural festivals in India